Surfside 6 is an American television series starring Troy Donahue, Van Williams, and Lee Patterson, and co-starring Diane McBain and Margarita Sierra. The show centers on a Miami Beach detective agency set on a houseboat. It premiered on ABC on October 3, 1960, and ended on June 25, 1962, with a total of 74 episodes over the course of 2 seasons.

Series overview

Episodes

Season 1 (1960–61)

Season 2 (1961–62)

External links
 

Surfside 6